Eadie may refer to:

Eadie (surname)
Eadie (given name)
Eadie (automobile), a brand of car manufactured in the United Kingdom between 1898 and 1901.
Eadie Island, one of the South Shetland Islands in Antarctica
Eadie–Hofstee diagram, a graphical representation of enzyme kinetics
Eadie Was a Lady, a 1945 American musical comedy
National Bank of New Zealand Ltd v Eadie, a case in New Zealand

See also